The men's 4 × 100 metres relay races at the 2000 Summer Olympics as part of the athletics program were held on Friday 29 September and Saturday 30 September.

The top two teams in each of the initial five heats automatically qualified for the semi-final. The next six fastest team from across the heats also qualified. The top three teams in each of the semi-finals automatically qualified for the final. The next two fastest team from the semi-finals also qualified.

Records
These were the standing world and Olympic records (in seconds) prior to the 2000 Summer Olympics.

Medalists

* Athletes who participated in the heats only and received medals.

Results
All times shown are in seconds.
 Q denotes qualification by place in heat.
 q denotes qualification by overall place.
 DNS denotes did not start.
 DNF denotes did not finish.
 DQ denotes disqualification.
 NR denotes national record.
 AR denotes area/continental record.
 OR denotes Olympic record.
 WR denotes world record.
 PB denotes personal best.
 SB denotes season best.

Heats

Round 1- Overall

Semi-finals

Semi-Finals overall

Final

References

External links
Official Report of the 2000 Sydney Summer Olympics
Results, round 1 – IAAF
Results, semi-final – IAAF
Results, final – IAAF

4 x 100 metres relay men
Relay foot races at the Olympics
Men's events at the 2000 Summer Olympics